Shahrak-e Shahid Mohammad Montazeri (also Romanized as Shahrak-e Shahīd Moḩammad Montaz̧erī; also known as Shahrak-e Āyatollāh Montaz̧erī) is a village in Qeblehi Rural District, in the Central District of Dezful County, Khuzestan Province, Iran. At the 2006 census, its population was 3,599, in 787 families.

References 

Populated places in Dezful County